An Ye-seul (born October 28, 1995) is a South Korean singer. She is known as one of the Top 9 of Mnet's Superstar K4.

Career
In 2012, An participated in Superstar K4. She eventually made it to the top 9.

In 2016, she participated in the show Produce 101, a reality girl group survival show on Mnet. It is a large-scale project in which the public "produces" a unit girl group by choosing members from a pool of 101 trainees from 46 entertainment companies as well as the group's concept, debut song, and group name.

Discography

Single

Filmography

TV series

References

External links 

 

1995 births
Living people
People from Gangwon Province, South Korea
People from Wonju
K-pop singers
South Korean female idols
South Korean women pop singers
South Korean rhythm and blues singers
Superstar K participants
Produce 101 contestants
21st-century South Korean women singers
21st-century South Korean singers